Schaefferia profundissima is a species of  springtail (arthropods) endemic to the Krubera-Voronja cave system in Georgia. It is one of the deepest terrestrial animal ever found on Earth, living at > below the cave entrance. It was discovered in the CAVEX Team expedition of 2010.

References

Collembola

Fauna of Georgia (country)
Cave arthropods